The Kid from Santa Fe is a 1940 American Western film directed by Raymond K. Johnson and written by Carl Krusada. The film stars Jack Randall, Clarene Curtis, Forrest Taylor, Claire Rochelle, Tom London and George Chesebro. The film was released on May 23, 1940, by Monogram Pictures.

Plot
Sheriff Holt, hires a new deputy, that goes by the name Santa Fe Kid. Kid decides to disguise himself as a bandit, to track down a gang of smugglers in the Mexican border. He then discovers that the gang leader is a respected townsman, Bill Stewart.

Cast          
Jack Randall as Santa Fe Kid
Clarene Curtis as Anne Holt
Forrest Taylor as Sheriff Holt
Claire Rochelle as Millie Logan
Tom London as Bill Stewart
George Chesebro as Kent
Dave O'Brien as Chester
Jimmy Aubrey as Henry Lupton
Kenne Duncan as Joe Lavida
Carl Mathews as George
Steve Clark as Herman

References

External links
 

1940 films
American Western (genre) films
1940 Western (genre) films
Monogram Pictures films
Films directed by Raymond K. Johnson
American black-and-white films
1940s English-language films
1940s American films